Teed is a surname. Notable persons with that name include:

Cyrus Teed (1839–1908), an American physician and religious leader.
Dick Teed (1926–2014), an American baseball player
Douglas Arthur Teed (1860–1929), an American painter.
Ellen Hollond, née Teed (1822–1884), an English writer and philanthropist.
Eric Teed (1926–2010), a Canadian lawyer and politician.
Freeman G. Teed (died 1916), Los Angeles city auditor.
George Hamilton Teed
Jill Teed, a Canadian actress
John Teed (c.1770–before 1837), an English merchant and politician.
Matthew Teed (1828–1904), an American politician.
Nancy Teed (1949–1993), a Canadian politician.
Nathaniel Teed
Shirley Teed

English-language surnames